The Let the Moreno Play Movement (Movimiento Dejen Jugar al Moreno) is a political party in Colombia founded by Carlos Moreno de Caro.
At the last legislative elections, 10 March 2002, the party won as one of the many small parties parliamentary representation. In the election of 2006, the party won no seats.

External links
Democracia a distancia: Elecciones 2006 (Portalcol.com) (Information about the party's list of candidates to the Colombian Senate, Spanish).

Political parties in Colombia